Marina Mikhailovna Chuvirina  (Russian: Марина Михайловна Чувирина ) is a former Soviet tennis player. 

She played in singles at the Wimbledon in 1969. She did not play in the first round. She lost to the American player Kristy Pigeon in the second round. Her partner in mixed doubles Vladimir Korotkov lost in the Third Round to the Australian player Ray Ruffels and Karen Krantzcke.

She played in singles at the French Open in 1972. She lost to the Dutch player Gertruida Walhof in the first round. Her partner in women's doubles, West German Kora Schediwy lost in the first round to the American player Rosie Casals and the British player Virginia Wade. Her partner in mixed doubles,Teimuraz Kakulia lost in the first Round to the Australian player Bob Howe and the French player Rosy Darmon.

Career finals

Singles (6–6)

Doubles (10–6)

References

External links
 

1947 births
Living people
Soviet female tennis players